"Happiness" is a song by British electronic music duo Pizzaman, which consisted of John Reid and Norman Cook, released in 1995 as the third single from their only album, Pizzamania (1995). It contains a sample of "Five Songs by Four Voices" performed by English poet, artist and musician Edward Barton, and uses a backbeat from "Break 4 Love" by Raze. The song peaked at number 19 on the UK Singles Chart and number three on the UK Dance Chart.

Del Monte Foods corporation used "Happiness" in a UK fruit juice ad.

Critical reception
Alan Jones from Music Week wrote, "Easily my favourite single of the week is "Happiness", the barnstorming release from Norman Cook's latest alter-ego Pizzaman. Its swirl of influences include jazzy piano frills, gospelly vocals, a backbeat lifted from "Break 4 Love", Sixties-style organ, Seventies-style synth and much more. They all dovetail together perfectly." Brad Beatnik from the RM Dance Update rated it four out of five, adding, "Norman Cook and the Playboys finally release one of the most uptempo and infectious tracks on their debut album. The Club mix and Playboys dub use less of the singalong vocal and stick to harder grooves while the original and Euro-versions go for the real hands-in-the-air effect. A definite party anthem."

Music video
A music video was produced to promote the song, directed by American filmmaker and photojournalist Michael Dominic. It was later published on YouTube in June 2010.

Track listing
 12", UK (1995)
"Happiness" (Club Mix) – 6:55
"Happiness" (Play Boys Fully Loaded Dub) – 7:52
"Happiness" (Original 12" Mix) – 5:22
"Happiness" (Euro Mix) – 5:21

 CD single, UK (1995)
"Happiness" (Eat Me Edit) – 3:28
"Happiness" (Club Mix) – 6:57
"Happiness" (Play Boys Fully Loaded Dub) – 7:54
"Happiness" (Original Mix) – 5:24
"Happiness" (Euro Mix) – 5:24
"Happiness" (Play Boys Fully Loaded Dub II) – 7:12

 CD maxi, Europe (1995)
"Happiness" (Eat Me Edit) – 3:26
"Happiness" (Club Mix) – 6:55
"Happiness" (Play Boys Fully Loaded Dub) – 7:52
"Happiness" (Original Mix) – 5:22
"Happiness" (Euro Mix) – 5:21
"Happiness" (Play Boys Fully Loaded Dub II) – 7:11
"Happiness" (Bonus Mix) – 4:54

Charts

References

1995 singles
1995 songs
Disco songs
House music songs